Hi Hi Puffy AmiYumi is an American animated television series created by Sam Register and produced by Renegade Animation and Cartoon Network Studios, which aired on Cartoon Network from 2004 to 2006. The series stars fictionalized and animated versions of the Japanese pop rock group Puffy AmiYumi. The series premiered on November 19, 2004 and ended on June 27, 2006, with a total of three seasons and 39 episodes, leaving a total of 34 episodes aired and five episodes unaired in North America.

During its run, the series was nominated for an Annie Award three times. Merchandise based on the series has also been produced, such as video games, home media releases, toys, and clothing.

In March 2022, the entire series was made available on HBO Max in Latin America. An additional web page was made available in North America as well; however, it is currently inaccessible.

Premise 

Hi Hi Puffy AmiYumi follows the adventures of two pop stars and best friends: Yumi Yoshimura (voiced by Grey DeLisle), a cynical, sarcastic, and grumpy tomboy and Ami Onuki (voiced by Janice Kawaye), a peppy, optimistic, and cheerful girly girl. Both are based on the real Japanese pop duo Puffy AmiYumi, but with different appearances and exaggerated personalities. They travel around the world on their customized tour bus along with their well-intentioned yet greedy manager Kaz Harada (voiced by Keone Young). From rocking out at a concert to hanging out in their hometown of Tokyo, the duo take the world by storm with their musical talent, trend-setting style, and humor, dishing out lessons in J-pop justice and establishing the international language of "cool" along the way.

Secondary characters include: Jang-Keng (voiced by Grey DeLisle) and Tekirai (voiced by Janice Kawaye), the duo's pet cats who enjoy tormenting Kaz; Harmony (voiced by Sandy Fox), a six-year-old girl who is the self-proclaimed "Number One Fan" of Puffy AmiYumi and (later) Kaz and constantly stalks them; Eldwin Blair (voiced by Nathan Carlson), a sinister land developer who tries to tear down beloved places for his own selfish needs; King Chad (voiced by Katie Leigh), a selfish "bad boy" who is a master of the card game Stu-Pi-Doh! (a parody of Yu-Gi-Oh!); the evil Talent Suckers (voiced by Nathan Carlson and Corey Burton), a vampire rock trio from Transylvania; and Atchan (voiced by Rob Paulsen), a caricature of Vo Atsushi (lead singer of the pop band New Rote'ka) who speaks in third-person and thinks he is a superhero.

The animated Puffy AmiYumi travel all over the world in their tour bus. While appearing the same size as a regular bus on the outside, it appears to have enough internal space to house the girls' rooms (including full-sized beds), Kaz's room, their equipment, televisions, and computers, among other things. In the episode "Domo", Kaz refers to an upstairs area. It also seems capable of running on autopilot, as Kaz, Ami, and Yumi are sometimes sitting in the rear cabin of the bus while traveling. Occasionally, the rear door has been opened to receive packages delivered by a boy on a scooter.

During the first season, the show included live-action clips of the real Ami and Yumi making childish commentary (in English and non-subtitled Japanese) at the beginning and end of each episode. They only performed short clips at the beginning of the show during the second and third seasons. Starting with the second season, the duo was sometimes shown holding title cards introducing the cartoon segments. At the end of the episode "Sitcomi Yumi", Ami and Yumi watched television and saw the animated Kaz with the real Ami and Yumi. All of the live-action clips were produced by Freegate, Ltd.

The real PUFFY performs the cartoon's theme song (which is also in Japanese, German, Spanish, and Portuguese in the respective countries), and many episodes feature one or more of the duo's songs playing in the background, along with music by Andy Sturmer.

Though the characters speak English, the script intersperses their vernacular with Japanese speech, especially when the characters react to events that they find to be surprising. Calling out "Tasukete!" instead of "Help!" is commonly used.

Voice cast 
 Janice Kawaye as Ami Onuki, Tekirai, News Reporter Additional Voices
Grey DeLisle as Yumi Yoshimura, Jang Keng, Fan Club President, Additional Voices
Keone Young as Kaz Harada, Domo, Security Guard, Additional Voices
Rob Paulsen as Atchan, Dr. Mysto, Clyde Easy Glide, Mr. Darrell, Additional Voices
Corey Burton as Nikolai, Scar Tissue, Road Kill Flash Backman, Additional Voices
Sandy Fox as Harmony
Nathan Carlson as Vladimir, Eldwin Blair, Pizza Guy, Emecee, Additional Voices
Katie Leigh as King Chad
Kimberly Brooks as Jill
Lara Jill Miller as Julie
Will Ryan as Farmer Zeke, Alien Banana #1, Wall, Rumaki, Old Camper 3, Wasabi, Sumo Wrestler, Muscle Bound Guy, Defensive End, Riptide's Coach
William Hanna as Jang-Keng (Tom and Jerry audio, "Small Stuff" only)

Production

Development 

According to Register, the target audience of the show is boys and girls from 6 to 11 years old. However, it also has a cult following of teen and adult fans of the real-life Ami Onuki and Yumi Yoshimura who make up the Japanese pop duo Puffy AmiYumi. Register, who was a fan of the band, wished to spread its fame to other parts of the world and thus created the series.

The series features the adventures of animated versions of the duo, who have been immensely popular in Japan since making their debut, and is the second television show to be based on the band after Pa-Pa-Pa-Pa-Puffy, which aired in Japan from 1997 to 2002. The group now has its own U.S. albums, including a 2004 companion album to this program, and was known to viewers of Cartoon Network in the US for performing the theme to the Teen Titans animated series. During production of the series, DeLisle learned some Japanese from Kawaye and Young, both of whom speak the language fluently.

The cartoon was one of the few cartoons at the time produced entirely in the United States, with a number of characters designed by famed Canadian artist Lynne Naylor, who also designed characters for other Cartoon Network shows, including Samurai Jack, Foster's Home for Imaginary Friends, and The Powerpuff Girls, which got the show nominated for the coveted Annie Award. The pilot used a combination of Macromedia Flash and traditional cel animation. Each program was 30 minutes long (with commercials) and featured three seven-minute segments. The visual style of the show is anime-influenced. The show later switched to Flash animation once the show was picked up for a full series, due to traditional cel animation becoming too expensive to use.

The show takes inspiration from various works animated in Japan, such as Pokémon, Digimon, the Sunbow Productions animated series based on Hasbro properties, the Walt Disney Animation Japan animated production, the Marvel Productions animated series, the Studio Ghibli animated production, and the Rankin/Bass animated series. Other inspirations included old MGM and Warner Bros. cartoons, as well as Hanna-Barbera and Mirisch/UA cartoons, UPA shorts, and the works of Jay Ward. Some of the show's crew members included various writers from Nickelodeon's CatDog, including Steven Banks, Kit Boyce and Robert Lamoreaux. Prior to the show's release, Cartoon Network also released animated promos done by Klasky Csupo, the animation studio behind many Nickelodeon original shows, such as Rugrats, Aaahh!!! Real Monsters, The Wild Thornberrys, Rocket Power, As Told by Ginger, and All Grown Up!.

Sam Register originally pitched the idea of Puffy AmiYumi having their own television series on Cartoon Network, and afterwards, Renegade Animation developed a test short on April 22, 2003 in hopes of making the channel greenlight the show's production. Renegade Animation originally, at first, created other Cartoon Network pilots before Hi Hi Puffy AmiYumi; two of which feature Captain Sturdy; one in 2001, entitled "Back in Action", and the other in 2003, entitled "The Originals", but they were ultimately rejected, and Renegade Animation then started working on Hi Hi Puffy AmiYumi starting with its pilot on April 22, 2003. The pilot was not broadcast, but was initially successful, and got the green-light from Cartoon Network. Finally, it was shown in non-full version as a preview on Cartoon Network DVDs and VHS tapes. The entire pilot was found by series' director, Darrell Van Citters, and was uploaded to Vimeo on April 5, 2018. The series was officially announced at Cartoon Network's upfront on February 26, 2004. It was originally planned to premiere in December 2004, but was later pushed back to November 19.

Cancellation 
On October 2, 2006, the show's crew announced on their blog that Cartoon Network had cancelled Hi Hi Puffy AmiYumi after three seasons and 39 episodes due to management shakeup, leading Sam Register to leave the channel, until Register officially became the president of Cartoon Network Studios on August 28, 2020.

Appearances in other media 

The show had been acknowledged and referenced several times, even outside of Cartoon Network themselves. These also come in the form of parodies, albeit rare.
 A clip of the episode, "AmiYumi 3000", can be seen playing on a TV in the film Nancy Drew.
 In 2012, Ami and Yumi appeared on Cartoon Network's 20th anniversary poster.
 Yumi later made a cameo appearance in the OK K.O.! Let's Be Heroes special Crossover Nexus.
 Ami and Yumi made a background appearance, within their poster in a TV pilot for Villainous.
 Ami's haircut appeared as a wardrobe item in the 2020 mobile game, KleptoCats: Cartoon Network.
 Parodies of Ami and Yumi, named Ori and Yori, show up in the Nickelodeon series Kappa Mikey.

Episodes 

Hi Hi Puffy AmiYumi premiered in the United States on Cartoon Network on November 19, 2004. After ending on June 27, 2006, the show continued to rerun until December 22, 2006, where it aired in reruns normally, and occasionally, would be one of the few non-Cartoon Cartoons to air in reruns on The Cartoon Cartoon Show before being removed from the network's schedule.

Since Cartoon Network is available worldwide, the show has been dubbed into multiple languages and aired on Cartoon Network worldwide. In Canada, the series premiered on YTV on September 5, 2005. In Japan, the show began airing on Cartoon Network in English with Japanese subtitles in 2005. A dubbed version began airing on TV Tokyo's Oha Suta block on October 6, 2005, and started to air on January 8, 2006 on Cartoon Network Japan.

In Germany, the show aired on Cartoon Network Germany with all episodes. It premiered in 2005 on the Cartoon Network's block of Kabel eins. The show stopped airing there after two seasons in 2006. The reason was that Cartoon Network Germany launched and most of the shows moved there.

In Poland, the show aired on Cartoon Network Poland from 2005 to 2006.

In Australia, the show premiered on April 3, 2005. It stopped airing on Cartoon Network Australia in November 2008. The third season was never shown there. From August to November 2009, the Australian channel 9Go! showed the last season instead and was abandoned in January 2010.

As of March 2022, the show still airs on Tooncast at 2:30am and 2:30pm respectively.

While the show has had a limited release on DVD in America (as seen below), the entire series was quietly released on HBO Max in the Latin America area. The release includes both the Spanish and original English tracks.

Reception

Critical response 
Los Angeles Times wrote that the show is "modern, in its retro, Asian-tinged way -- in other words, right in line with the Cartoon Network aesthetic -- but nothing new", and called it "bright and loud and sensational".

Ratings 
Hi Hi Puffy AmiYumi debuted on Cartoon Network on November 19, 2004 at 7:30 PM ET/PT with two half-hour episodes. The show charted double-digit increases with Girls 6–11 in ratings and delivery for Cartoon Network's Fridays programming block. During the following week, the show became the network's top-rated hit for kids 6–11. It also increased Cartoon Network's audience among that age group by 49% over the previous year.

Awards and nominations 
The series has been nominated three times for the Annie Award. Two of them came in 2005 and one came in 2006.

Merchandise

CD 
 Hi Hi Puffy AmiYumi
 Hi Hi

Home media

Video games 
There are two video games released by D3Publisher of America (D3PA) based on the show:
 Hi Hi Puffy AmiYumi: Kaznapped! (Game Boy Advance, 2005): Ami and Yumi return from a world tour and decide to take a break. Harmony hypnotizes and kidnaps Kaz, and traps Ami and Yumi onto a giant lollipop. Their cats, Jang Keng and Tekirai, lick them free, and Ami and Yumi set off on a journey to rescue Kaz. This title was developed by Altron.
 Hi Hi Puffy AmiYumi: The Genie and the Amp (Nintendo DS, 2006): Ami and Yumi are having trouble getting their creative juices flowing to lay down some tracks for their new album, only for them to find a magic genie that sends them to various time periods to collect magic notes, which are required for the girls to play the "Ultimate World Tour." This title was developed by Sensory Sweep Studios.

Marketing 
 A "falloon" (a float with balloon elements) of Puffy AmiYumi's cartoon tour bus (complete with the supporting characters in puppet form), the cartoon version of Puffy AmiYumi as a balloon, and the real PUFFY appeared in the Macy's Thanksgiving Day Parade in 2005.
 A line of toys intended for girls was produced by Mattel (makers of the popular Barbie doll and Hot Wheels cars) and released for the 2005 Christmas season.
 Two DVDs, Let's Go! and Rock Forever, featuring various episodes of the show, were released on November 29, 2005.
 The American costume company Rubie's produced a line of Hi Hi Puffy AmiYumi costumes and accessories for girls for Halloween 2006.

See also

 PUFFY
 Hi Hi Puffy AmiYumi: The Genie and the Amp (Nintendo DS) (2006)
 Pink Lady and Jeff, the previous attempt to import a Japanese pop group to US television.

References

External links
 Hi Hi Puffy AmiYumi at Cartoon Network
 

 
2000s American animated television series
2004 American television series debuts
2006 American television series endings
American children's animated action television series
American children's animated adventure television series
American children's animated comedy television series
American children's animated fantasy television series
American children's animated musical television series
American flash animated television series
American television series with live action and animation
Animated duos
Animated musical groups
Animation based on real people
Anime-influenced Western animated television series
Cartoon Network original programming
Television series by Cartoon Network Studios
English-language television shows
Japan in non-Japanese culture
Metafictional television series
Puffy AmiYumi
Teen animated television series
Television series based on singers and musicians
Television series created by Sam Register
Television shows adapted into comics
Television shows adapted into video games
Television shows set in Japan
Vampires in animated television